Comitas oahuensis is a species of sea snail, a marine gastropod mollusc in the family Pseudomelatomidae.

Description
The length of the shell varies between 16.8 mm and 17.25 mm, the diameter between 6.9 mm and 7.75 mm.

Distribution
This marine species occurs off Hawaii

References

  Powell, A.W.B. 1969. The family Turridae in the Indo-Pacific. Part. 2. The subfamily Turriculinae. Indo-Pacific Mollusca 2(10): 207–415, pls 188–324

External links
 
 Biolib.cz: Comitas ohuaensis

ohuaensis
Gastropods described in 1969